Karen H. Gibson is the Sergeant at Arms of the United States Senate and a retired military intelligence officer.

Early life and education
Gibson was raised in Bozeman, Montana, where she graduated from Bozeman High School. Gibson earned a Bachelor of Science degree in industrial engineering from Purdue University, a Master of Science in national security strategy from the National War College, and a Master of Science in strategic intelligence from the National Intelligence University.

Career
Gibson served in the United States Army for 33 years, retiring with the rank of Lieutenant General. Prior to her appointment as sergeant at arms, Gibson served as the deputy Director of National Intelligence for national security partnerships, director of intelligence for United States Central Command, director of intelligence for the Combined Joint Task Force, and deputy commanding general for the United States Army Cyber Command.

Senate Majority Leader Chuck Schumer announced the appointment of Gibson as sergeant at arms of the United States Senate in March 2021. She had recently worked with Russel L. Honoré to make recommendations for Congress in the wake of the 2021 storming of the United States Capitol. Gibson is the second woman to serve as the Senate Sergeant at Arms. Gibson, her deputy, Kelly Fado, and Chief of Staff, Jennifer Hemingway, are the first all-female team occupying the Senate's top three security posts.

References

External links

Year of birth missing (living people)
Living people
Sergeants at Arms of the United States Senate
Women in law enforcement
Female generals of the United States Army
People from Bozeman, Montana
Purdue University alumni
Military personnel from Montana
21st-century American women